Morayfield is a town and suburb in the Moreton Bay Region, Queensland, Australia.

Geography
Morayfield is a mostly residential area, consisting mainly of low-set brick homes and some semi-rural acreage. The main commercial area is concentrated along Morayfield Road and includes the Morayfield Shopping Centre. The suburb is situated in the Burpengary Creek catchment area.

The Bruce Highway passes from south to north through the suburb.

History
In 1868, Brisbane man George Raff bought some of the land held by the failed Caboolture Cotton Company, calling it "Moray Field", derived from Raff's native Morayshire in Scotland. It was often written as "Morayfields" and, from 1881, became "Morayfield".

Caboolture State School opened in present-day Morayfield on 4 August 1873. In 1890, it was renamed Caboolture South State School. In 1908, it was renamed Morayfield State School. The original school building is still on the site and is heritage-listed. (This school should not be confused with current Caboolture State School in Caboolture when originally opened in 1889 and was then known as Caboolture North State School).

Morayfield State High School opened on 27 January 1981.

Until the mid-1980s, Morayfield remained a rural area consisting of a small dairy holding and small crop farming enterprises. However, with the population pressure caused by the rapid growth of the greater Brisbane area, it has since suffered to some degree from random or unplanned residential development and rapid population growth. It is a thriving retail and service industry commercial centre.

Morayfield East State School opened on 29 January 1991.

Minimbah State School opened on 28 January 1997.

Morayfield Shopping Centre opened on 14 April 1997 with an expansion in 2005.

In January 2011, parts of Morayfield were flooded during the 2010-2011 Queensland floods.

Carmichael College opened as a private primary school in 2015. In 2020, it introduced secondary schooling and expects to offer all years through to Year 12 by 2025. 

The median age of the Morayfield population was 32 years, 6 years below the national median of 38. 77.2% of people living in Morayfield were born in Australia. The other top responses for country of birth were New Zealand 5.5%, England 3.3%, Philippines 0.7%, South Africa 0.6%, Papua New Guinea 0.5%. 88.2% of people spoke only English at home; the next most common languages were Samoan 0.8%, Mandarin 0.5%, Korean 0.4%, Tagalog 0.3% and German 0.2%.

Heritage listings

Morayfield has a number of heritage-listed sites, including:
 68 Captain Whish Avenue: Oaklands Sugar Mill
 196-230 Morayfield Road: Morayfield State School
 34 Nolan Drive: Morayfield Plantation

Education 
Morayfield State School is a government primary (Prep-6) school for boys and girls at 196-230 Morayfield Road. In 2017, the school had an enrolment of 554 students with 46 teachers (44 full-time equivalent) and 33 non-teaching staff (23 full-time equivalent). It includes a special education program.

Minimbah State School is a government primary (Prep-6) school for boys and girls at the corner Walkers Road and Minimbah Drive. In 2017, the school had an enrolment of 802 students with 57 teachers (51 full-time equivalent) and 29 non-teaching staff (18 full-time equivalent). It includes a special education program.

Morayfield East State School is a government primary (Prep-6) school for boys and girls at 107 Graham Road. In 2017, the school had an enrolment of 918 students with 64 teachers (58 full-time equivalent) and 47 non-teaching staff (31 full-time equivalent). It includes a special education program.

Morayfield State High School is a government secondary (7-12) school for boys and girls at Visentin Road. In 2017, the school had an enrolment of 1,425 students with 115 teachers (112 full-time equivalent) and 48 non-teaching staff (36 full-time equivalent). It includes a special education program.

Carmichael College is a private primary and secondary (Prep-12) school for boys and girls at 793-833 Oakey Flat Road. In 2017, the school had an enrolment of 158 students with 16 teachers (14 full-time equivalent) and 6 non-teaching staff (3 full-time equivalent).  The school is named after Irish missionary Amy Carmichael. The Creekside Community Church (one of the Christian Community Churches of Australia) is on the school campus and supports the school.

Transport
Morayfield railway station provides access to regular Queensland Rail City network services to Brisbane and Ipswich, as well as Caboolture and the Sunshine Coast. Morayfield Road is a major road that passes through both Morayfield and Caboolture, most of the regions shops are situated on this major road, including the Morayfield Shopping Centre.

All bus services in Morayfield travel ether via or to/from the Morayfield Bus Station located at 171 Morayfield Road adjacent to Devereaux Drive with access to Morayfield Shopping Centre. Buses also travel to Morayfield railway station except for Buses 660 which travels along Morayfield Road bypassing the railway station and route 9999 that terminates at Morayfield Bus Station.

The 667 local loop bus service provides transport throughout southern portion of the suburb connecting it to other bus services at Morayfield Bus Station and train services at Morayfield railway station. The service also travels to Burpengary on Sunday only. The 656 service runs a loop to Upper Caboolture and connects to train services at Morayfield railway station and bus services at Morayfield Bus Station. Bus routes 653 and 654 provides a connection to Caboolture South and Bellmere with a connection to train services at both Morayfield and Caboolture railway stations. Bus route 651 travels from Morayfield railway station via Morayfield Road to northern Caboolture and back providing a bus connection to both Morayfield and Caboolture railway stations. The 660 bus also travels to Morayfield Bus Station providing connections to Redcliffe, Caboolture, Burpengary and Deception Bay. Bus 9999 is a service that operates from Donnybrook and Toorbul on Thursday morning and afternoon that provides connection to Caboolture and Morayfield Bus Station. There is also a bus service from Kilcoy through the QConnect network under route number 895. This service services Woodford, D'Agulair, Wamuran, Caboolture and terminates at Morayfield Bus Station.

See also
 List of tramways in Queensland

References

External links

 
 
 Caboolture Library - Morayfield

 
Suburbs of Moreton Bay Region
Towns in Queensland